Empyr is a French English-language rock band established in 2007 and made up of five members of four different French bands, Kyo, Pleymo, Watcha, and Vegastar.

History 
In 2008, the band released its debut album The Peaceful Riot that was recorded in Los Angeles and produced by Ken Andrews. The album, which combined elements of Kyo's pop rock with the other members' alternative metal backgrounds, was relatively successful reaching number 17 in France and number 20 in Belgian French charts. It also charted in Switzerland. The single "New Day" also got radio time. The band has also released a follow-up EP Your Skin, My Skin in 2009, and the album Unicorn in 2011, moving further into the pop rock sound of Kyo on the latter release. The band has been inactive since 2012, with Poher and Dubos returning to Kyo, while Julliard would eventually rejoin Pleymo, and Duquesne would join industrial metal group Mass Hysteria.

Members
Benoît Poher of French band Kyo – lead singer
Florian Dubos of French band Kyo – guitar – backing vocals
Frédéric Duquesne of French band Watcha – guitar
Benoît Julliard of French band Pleymo – bass, backing vocals
Jocelyn Moze of French band Vegastar – drums

In popular culture
In 2010, the track "It's Gonna Be" from the album Unicorn was used for the trailer of an episode in season 7 of CSI : New York.
In 2011, the same track "It's Gonna Be" was used for international launching of iPhone 4S on Apple website alongside Adele's "Rolling in the Deep"
In 2011, the track "Give Me More" again from Unicorn was used in the soundtrack of the film Final Destination 5.

Discography

Albums

EPs

Singles
(Selective)
2008: "New Day"
2009: "Your Skin My Skin"

References

French musical groups
Musical groups established in 2007